The Ambliara State, also spelt Ambaliyara was a princely state under Mahi Kantha Agency of the Bombay Presidency during the era of the British Raj in India.

History 

According to the Gujarat State Gazetteers, the rulers were "Khant Kolis" by caste, and claimed descent from the Chauhans of Sambhar and Ajmer. A single, undated one paisa banknote was issued by the state. Ambliara State was merged with Baroda State under the Attachment Scheme on 10 July 1943.

See also 
 Political integration of India

References 

Aravalli district
Princely states of Gujarat
1943 disestablishments in India

Koli princely states